The 1954–55 season was Blackpool F.C.'s 47th season (44th consecutive) in the Football League. They competed in the 22-team Division One, then the top tier of English football, finishing nineteenth.

Stan Mortensen was the club's top scorer for the eleventh consecutive season, with eleven goals in all competitions.

Harry Johnston retired at the end of the season after 21 years of service for Blackpool, his only professional club.  He remains the club's longest-serving player.

Table

Notes

References

External links
Squad photo

Blackpool F.C.
Blackpool F.C. seasons